Megalomycter teevani is a species of flabby whalefish found in the waters of the Atlantic Ocean near Bermuda at depths of around .  This species is the only known member of its genus.

References
 

Cetomimidae
Monotypic fish genera
Fish described in 1966